The LA Weekly Detour Music Festival was a music festival that was held every October in Los Angeles, California. The entire block surrounding Los Angeles City Hall was closed off and three stages were erected for the festival, which lasted from noon to midnight on the day it was held. It was notable for attracting many big-name acts despite its status as a relatively young festival. The festival had been held every October since 2006. The website underwent a large change in July 2008 when the lineup for the third festival was announced. New for the 2008 festival was the BYOB (Bring Your Own Band) Battle of the Bands competition, which features online voting to pick an unsigned artist to play the festival in 2008. On August 18, 2009, LA Weekly announced via their website that the festival would not take place in 2009 since it has been put "on hiatus".

Lineups

Bands billed as headliners are bolded.

October 7, 2006

 Beck
 Queens of the Stone Age
 Basement Jaxx
 Peeping Tom
 Redd Kross
 Blonde Redhead
 !!!
 Nortec Collective
 Blackalicious
 Of Montreal
 The Like
 The Elected
 Oh No! Oh My!
 The Blood Arm
 Everybody Else
 Wired All Wrong
 The Foundation
 VHS or Beta
 Weird Science
 Shepard Fairey
 Travis Keller

October 6, 2007

 Bloc Party
 Justice
 Satellite Party
 Kinky
 Comedians of Comedy
 Turbonegro
 Teddybears
 Moving Units
 The Raveonettes
 Shout Out Louds
 Autolux
 Celebrity Skin
 The Aliens
 The Aggrolites
 Busy P
 DJ Mehdi
 SebastiAn
 Kavinsky
 So Me
 Noisettes
 The Cool Kids
 The Deadly Syndrome
 Scissors for Lefty
 Johnossi
 Augie March
 Mink
 Nico Vera
 Franki Chan
 Travis Keller
 Bruce Perdew
 Le Castle Vania

October 4, 2008

 The Mars Volta
 Gogol Bordello
 Shiny Toy Guns
 The Presets
 Cut Copy
 Matt Costa
 Black Lips
 Hercules and Love Affair
 Grand Ole Party
 Datarock
 Bitter:Sweet
 The Submarines
 Adam Freeland
 The Bloody Beetroots
 Surkin
 Para One
 Guns n Bombs
 Peanut Butter Wolf
 Buraka Som Sistema
 Nico Vega
 Japanese Motors
 The Mae Shi
 We Are Wolves
 Afternoons
 Noah and the Whale
 Mugison
 donMoy
 DJ Kid Lightning
 Paparazzi
 AC Means
 The Monolators

Returning Artists
The only act from 2006's Detour Festival to return in 2007 was Travis Keller, who had DJ sets both years. Nico Vega also performed at both the 2007 and 2008 festivals.

References

Music festivals in Los Angeles